Challengers is a role-playing game published by Ragnarok Enterprises in 1985.

Description
Challengers: Unique Superhero Adventuring is a superhero role-playing system based on a simplified version of the To Challenge Tomorrow rules. There are two books: one consisting of character and combat rules; the second describing a world where superheroes exist, important governmental organizations, sample characters, and six scenario suggestions.

Publication history
Challengers was designed by David Nalle, and published by Ragnarok Enterprises in 1985 as a digest-sized box including a 40-page book and a 20-page book.

Reception

References

Role-playing games introduced in 1985
Superhero role-playing games